Gunstein Bakke (born 30 March 1968) is a Norwegian novelist. He was born in Setesdal valley in Aust-Agder county in southern Norway. His debut novel Kontoret was published in 2000. A later novel Maud and Aud has been widely acclaimed and won the EU Prize for Literature. Bakke lives in Gotland and Oslo.

References

21st-century Norwegian novelists
1968 births
Living people